Joel Rydstrand (born August 10, 1995) is a Swedish professional footballer who currently plays for San Roque.

Career

Early career
After playing with Sirius in his native Sweden, Rystrand moved to the United States to play four years of college soccer at Creighton University between 2015 and 2018, making 82 appearances, scoring 7 goals and tallying 23 assists.

While at college, Rystrand appeared for USL PDL side Lane United.

Professional
On 11 January 2019, Rydstrand was selected 44th overall in the 2019 MLS SuperDraft by Seattle Sounders FC.

On 4 March 2019, Rydstrand signed with Seattle's USL Championship affiliate side Tacoma Defiance for their 2019 season.  Rydstrand was released by the Sounders organization on August 27 after having "expressed a desire to return to his home country." Through 16 appearances, Rydstrand totaled 1,111 minutes and notched one assist.

On 27 August 2019, Rystrand made the move to Spain, joining San Roque.

References

External links
Seattle Sounders FC player profile
Creighton player profile
LagStatistik player profile

1995 births
Living people
Association football midfielders
BKV Norrtälje players
Creighton Bluejays men's soccer players
IK Sirius players
Lane United FC players
Seattle Sounders FC draft picks
Footballers from Uppsala
Swedish expatriate footballers
Swedish expatriate sportspeople in the United States
Swedish footballers
Tacoma Defiance players
USL Championship players
USL League Two players